Tanoka Dwight Beard (born September 29, 1971) is an American former professional basketball player and coach. During his career, he was able to play both the power forward and center positions. He earned an All-EuroLeague Second Team selection in 2005, while leading the competition in rebounds, with an average of 10.6 per game. He won various European national domestic league championships and national domestic cup titles, in three different European countries.

High school
Beard attended Bonneville High School, in Washington Terrace, Utah, where he played high school basketball.

College career
After high school, Beard played college basketball at Boise State University, with the Boise State Broncos, from 1989 to 1993. He was named the Big Sky Conference's Freshman of the Year in 1990. He was named to the Big Sky Conference's First Team in 1991, 1992, and 1993. He was also named the MVP of the Big Sky Conference Tournament in 1993.

Over his four year college career, Beard averaged 17.7 points, 6.1 rebounds, and 1.5 blocks per game. In his senior season, he averaged 21.0 points, 7.7 rebounds and 1.4 blocks per game. Beard was named to the school's all-time basketball team in 2007.

Professional career
Beard was twice named the Liga ACB's (Spain's top-tier level league) Most Valuable Player, in 1999 and 2002. He also holds the EuroLeague record, for the highest Performance Index Rating (PIR), in a single game, with 63. He achieved the record while he was a member of Žalgiris Kaunas, in a EuroLeague 2003–04 season game against Fortitudo Bologna, on 22 January 2004. In that game, Beard recorded 35 points, 19 rebounds, 2 steals, and 2 blocks, in 38 minutes of playing time.

Coaching career
After he retired from playing pro club basketball, Beard began working as a basketball coach in 2012. In 2013, he opened up a basketball academy youth club called Ogden Pride Youth Basketball Club, in Ogden, Utah.

Awards and achievements

Clubs

Ülkerspor
Turkish Super League Champion: (1994–95)

Joventut Badalona
Spanish King's Cup Winner: (1996–97)

Žalgiris Kaunas
4× Lithuanian League Champion: (2002–03, 2003–04, 2004–05, 2006–07)
Baltic League Champion: (2004–05)
Lithuanian Federation Cup Winner: (2006–07)

Personal
5× Spanish League All-Star: (1996, 1997, 1998, 1999, 2001)
13× Spanish League Player of the Week: (1996–02)
10× Spanish League Player of the Month: (1997–02)
2× FIBA EuroStar: (1998–99, 1999–00)
Led the Spanish League in rebounding: (1998–99, 1999–00, 2001–02)
2× Spanish League MVP: (1998–99, 2001–02)
Led the Turkish Super League in rebounding: (2000–01)
5× EuroLeague MVP of the Round: (2003–07)
5×  Lithuanian League All-Star: (2003, 2004, 2005, 2006, 2007)
PIR record in a single EuroLeague game: (2004)
2× Lithuanian All-Star Game MVP: (2003–04, 2004–05)
4× Lithuanian League MVP: (2003–04, 2004–05, 2005–06, 2006–07)
Lithuanian League Finals MVP: (2003–04, 2006–07)
Baltic League MVP: (2004–05)
Baltic League Final Four MVP: (2004–05)
All-EuroLeague Second Team: (2004–05)
2× Led the EuroLeague in rebounding: (2004–05, 2006–07)
Led the Lithuanian League in rebounding: (2004–05)
2× Baltic League All-Star: (2006, 2007)
Baltic League All Star Game MVP: (2007)

Musical career
During 2005–06 season with Žalgiris, Beard recorded a track and a music video, with duo Linas and Simona, named "I Love U". This song was released on the album with the same name, on 22 July 2005, and in two weeks, it reached number 1 on the Lithuanian M-1 radio station. The lead singer of the duo, Linas Adomaitis, produced Beard's album, which has never been released.

EuroLeague career statistics

|-
| style="text-align:left;"| 2002–03
| style="text-align:left;"| Žalgiris Kaunas
| 3 || 2 || 30.0 || .629 || .000 || .875 || 13.3 || 1.7 || 1.7 || .3 || 17.0 || 27.3
|-
| style="text-align:left;"| 2003–04
| style="text-align:left;"| Žalgiris Kaunas
| 20 || 10 || 26.0 || .561 || .000 || .696 || 7.6 || .7 || 1.1 || .8 || 14.6 || 17.4
|-
| style="text-align:left;"| 2004–05
| style="text-align:left;"| Žalgiris Kaunas
| 20 || 20 || 32.5 || .578 || .333 || .771 || style="background:#cfecec;"|10.6 || 1.3 || 1.5 || .4 || 18.0 || 21.9
|-
| style="text-align:left;"| 2005–06
| style="text-align:left;"| Žalgiris Kaunas
| 14 || 13 || 27.8 || .429 || .130 || .781 || 8.1 || 2.1 || .9 || .3 || 13.6 || 15.4
|-
| style="text-align:left;"| 2006–07
| style="text-align:left;"| Žalgiris Kaunas
| 14 || 14 || 31.0 || .547 || .214 || .667 || style="background:#cfecec;"|9.9 || 1.6 || .9 || .6 || 14.5 || 18.3
|-
| style="text-align:left;"| 2007–08
| style="text-align:left;"| Žalgiris Kaunas
| 2 || 0 || 19.7 || .308 || .000 || .500 || 4.0 || .5 || 1.5 || .5 || 5.5 || 4.0
|- class="sortbottom"
| style="text-align:left;"| Career
| style="text-align:left;"|
| 73 || 59 || 29.1 || .536 || .188 || .730 || 9.1 || 1.3 || 1.1 || .5 || 15.2 || 18.5

References

External links
 Euroleague.net profile
 FIBA Europe profile
 Eurobasket.com profile
 Italian League profile 
 Spanish League profile 
 Spanish League archive profile 
 Turkish Super League profile
 Tanoka Beard at twitter.com
 Linas&Simona - "I Love U" (feat. Tanoka Beard) at YouTube.com

1971 births
Living people
American expatriate basketball people in Estonia
American expatriate basketball people in France
American expatriate basketball people in Israel
American expatriate basketball people in Italy
American expatriate basketball people in Lithuania
American expatriate basketball people in Spain
American expatriate basketball people in Turkey
Basketball players from Utah
American men's basketball coaches
American men's basketball players
BC Žalgiris players
Besançon BCD players
Boise State Broncos men's basketball players
CB Breogán players
Centers (basketball)
Fenerbahçe men's basketball players
Hapoel Holon players
Joventut Badalona players
Korvpalli Meistriliiga players
Liga ACB players
Pallacanestro Virtus Roma players
Power forwards (basketball)
Real Madrid Baloncesto players
Sportspeople from Ogden, Utah
Tartu Ülikool/Rock players
Ülker G.S.K. basketball players
Valencia Basket players